"The Malachite Casket", also known as "The Malachite Box", is a folk tale (the so-called skaz) of the Ural region collected and reworked by Pavel Bazhov. It was first published in the several issues of the Sverdlovsk newspaper Na Smenu! in September—November 1938, and in Uralsky Sovremennik (volume 1, 1938). It was later released as a part of The Malachite Casket collection. "The Malachite Casket" is considered to be one of the best stories in the collection. The story was translated from Russian into English by Alan Moray Williams in 1944, and by Eve Manning in the 1950s.

Publication 
This skaz was first published in the several issues of the Sverdlovsk newspaper Na Smenu! in September—November 1938, and in the Uralsky Sovremennik almanac (volume 1, 1938). It was released as a part of The Malachite Casket collection on 28 January 1939. The story was initially titled "Father's Gift", but the title was changed prior to publication. Bazhov liked the title so much that he named the whole collection after the story.

In 1944 the story was translated from Russian into English by Alan Moray Williams and published by Hutchinson as a part of The Malachite Casket: Tales from the Urals collection. In the 1950s another translation of The Malachite Casket was made by Eve Manning

Plot 
The talented miner Stepan dies, leaving his widow Nastasya (Nastyona) and their two sons and a daughter. Nastasya becomes the owner of the Malachite Casket, filled with jewellery, which Stepan got from the legendary Mistress of the Copper Mountain. Only Tanyushka likes to play with the Casket, and every piece of jewellery looks good on her. With black hair and green eyes, Tanyushka does not look like her mother at all, as if she was born to different parents. Her appearance resembles that of the Mistress of the Copper Mountain.

A female vagabond comes to their house and stays for a while, teaching Tanyushka silk embroidering. Nastasya is not happy with the arrangement, because she feels that Tanyushka "doesn't want to come to her own mother, but hugs a tramp". Nevertheless they become very close. One day, when the woman is alone with Tanyushka, the girl shows her the jewellery from the Malachite Casket, and in return the woman shows her a vision of a beautiful room decorated with malachite. She explains that the Malachite Room of the Tsar's palace is decorated with the malachite that Stepan mined. Next day the mysterious woman leaves Nastasya's house. Before she leaves, she presents the girl with a small button for a "remembrance".

Meanwhile Tanyushka grows up. She becomes an incredibly skilled needleworker and a great beauty, but keeps to herself and avoids other girls' company. People start calling her "a stone statue". A lot of young men at the Polevaya factory are attracted to her, but do not dare to approach her because of her coldness. Nastasya blames this behaviour on the vagabond "sorceress". One day a tragedy occurs in the family: the house is burned to the ground. Nastasya has to sell the Malachite Casket. A lot of merchants are interested in the jewellery. At the same time, a new bailiff arrives at the factory. He is quickly nicknamed "Flogger" because he always orders flagellation as a form of punishment. The bailiff is married to the mistress of the local landlord's son, and this rich woman eventually buys the Casket. However she cannot wear the jewellery because every piece of it pains her. She asks various craftsmen to fix it for her, but all of them refuse to touch the gemstones, explaining that none of the masters is willing to quarrel with their maker and they were made to fit one person only. Flogger's wife gives up and decides to resell the Casket at earliest convenience.

When the old landlord dies, his son wants his mistress back. Flogger is angry at first, but when he hears of Tanyushka's beauty and comes to see her, he is smitten. He tries to court the girl, but Tanyushka is very cold with him. The landlord's son, the noble man named Turchaninov, finally comes for Flogger's wife. When Tanyushka catches his eye, he forgets about his mistress.  He buys the Casket from her and offers it to Tanyushka, but she refuses. Turchaninov then claims that he wishes to marry the girl. She announces that she will only agree to the marriage if he shows her the Tsarina herself at the Malachite Room in Saint Petersburg. Turchaninov agrees. Dressed like a queen, Tanyushka arrives at the Palace, and walks directly to the Malachite Room. Tsarina enters the room, saying: "Now then, show me this high-handed maid". Upon hearing that Tanyushka frowns and says to Turchaninov: "What does this mean? I told ye to show me the Tsarina, and you've done it so as to show me to her. [...] I don't want to see any more of ye". Adding that he is no match for her anyway, Tanyushka leans against the malachite wall and melts away. She is never seen again, but the Mistress of the Copper Mountain gets a twin—people see two maids in malachite robes.

Themes 
Most scholars agree that Tanyushka—literally or metaphorically—is the daughter of the Mistress of the Copper Mountain. It was suggested that the Casket symbolizes the mystery that connected Stepan and the Mistress, or the secret marriage between the two. The Casket disappeared from the world of humans together with its owner, Tanyushka. Yelena Prikazchikova commented that Tanyushka is a typical changeling, the child of the mountain spirit and the mortal. Nataliya Shvabauer noted that Tanyushka is obviously the one destined to inherit the Casket, as she is inhumanly beautiful and is more attracted to gemstones than to people. Her mother Nastasya is an ordinary person, while the girl can appreciate the magic of the Mistress's gift. Tanyushka resembles the Mistress in every way, and just like her does not tolerate deceit.

On Tanyushka's melting away into the malachite wall, Yelena Prikazchikova said that petrifaction in fiction would normally mean death, but Tanyushka is the Mistress's double, so such act was like coming home for her. Mark Lipovetsky commented that while the Mistress embodies the struggle and unity between Eros and Thanatos, Tanyushka inherits the sexual magic: her beauty is striking and blinding men. Just like the Mistress persistently and spitefully provokes the local administration, forcing the protagonists ("The Mistress of the Copper Mountain", "The Two Lizards") to relay offensive messages, Tanyushka puts up resistance to the Tsarina herself. The Malachite Room is the symbol of magical power of stone in the human world. The magical malachite was used for simple human needs, to decorate the imperial chambers, which displeases the Mistress on principle. Therefore she tries in every possible way to demonstrate her power over it and makes the noble women cower before Tanyushka.

Denis Zherdev commented that the Mistress of the Copper Mountain's female domain is the world of chaos. It collides with the ordered factory world, and brings in randomness, variability, unpredictability and capriciousness. He also pointed out that the most important value in most Bazhov's early stories is family, and those who do not have that (e.g. Tanyushka) are never completely "normal".

Marina Balina mentioned Freud's interpretation of the motif of a double as a symbolic manifestation of death. The theme of the person leaving for the mountains at the end of his life is present in the story. Similar plot device can be found in "Two Lizards".

Reception 

"The Malachite Casket" is considered to be one of the best stories in the collection. The style of the story was praised. "The Malachite Casket" has been a popular subject for analysis. During Soviet times, every edition of The Malachite Box was usually prefaced by an essay commenting on the creativity of the Ural miners, cruel landlords, social oppression and the "great workers unbroken by the centuries of slavery". Maya Nikulina noted that one editor called the Casket a symbol "of hard work and persistence". The later scholars focused more on the symbolism and the relationship of the characters with the mysterious. Tanyushka was called Bazhov's classical binary character: on the one hand, she is a truth seeker and a talented person, on the other hand, she is an outsider, who violates social norms.

Adaptations 
The story inspired several film and stage adaptations.

 Stepan's Remembrance, a 1976 Soviet film, the adaptation of "The Mistress of the Copper Mountain" and "The Malachite Casket".
 The Malachite Casket, a 1972 filmstrip.
 The 2012 opera The Malachite Casket, based on "The Mistress of the Copper Mountain" and "The Malachite Casket", was created by Dmitry Batin.

The 1976 film 
The film The Malachite Casket was a part of the animated film series made at Sverdlovsk Film Studio from the early 1970s to early 1980s, on time for the 100th anniversary since the birth of Pavel Bazhov. The series included the following films: Sinyushka's Well (1973), The Mistress of the Copper Mountain (1975), The Malachite Casket, The Stone Flower (1977), Podaryonka (based on "Silver Hoof", 1978), Golden Hair (1979), and The Grass Hideaway (1982).

The Malachite Casket is a stop motion animated film directed by Oleg Nikolaevsky, with screenplay by Alexander Timofeevsky. It was narrated by Y. Puzyrev,. The music was composed by Vladislav Kazenin and performed by the State Symphony Cinema Orchestra.

References

Sources

External links

1938 short stories
Russian short stories
Fantasy short stories
The Malachite Box short stories
Pavel Bazhov